The Copiapó Solar Project is a 390 megawatt (MW) net solar thermal power project to be located near Copiapó, about 65 kilometers east of the coastal town of Caldera. The project is being developed by SolarReserve, and is scheduled to reach commercial operation in 2019.

The Copiapó project will comprise two 120 megawatt (MW), 130 MW gross) solar thermal towers with up to 14 hours thermal storage, combined with 150 MW of PV. The hybrid project will deliver over 1,700 gigawatt-hours (GW·h) annually, as non-intermittent baseload power, 24 hours a day. The project uses heliostat mirrors that collect and focus the sun's thermal energy to heat molten salt flowing through a solar power tower. The molten salt circulates from the tower to a storage tank, where it is then used to produce steam and generate electricity. Excess thermal energy is stored in the molten salt and can be used to generate power for up to fourteen hours, including during the evening hours and when direct sunlight is not available. The project's solar tower component technology is based on the SolarReserve Crescent Dunes Solar Energy Project in the US.

The project is expected to cost $2 billion.

The Copiapó Solar project was submitted to a full environmental assessment under the Chilean system of Environmental Impact Assessment (SEIA) administered by the Department of Environmental Assessment (SEA), and received an Environmental Qualification Resolution (RCA), as it is called the Chilean environmental permit, on August 19, 2015.

The hybrid concept combines two or more energy conversion mechanisms, that when integrated, overcome limitations inherent in either. The purpose is to provide a high level of energy security and reliability through the integrated mix of complementary generation methods. Specifically, photovoltaics, to date, has a lower cost if one ignores the dispatchability question, that instead is solved by the solar thermal component.

At the 2017-01 auction, SolarReserve bid $63/MWh for 24-hour CSP power with no subsidies, competing with other types such as LNG gas turbines.
And in the following auction they bid less than 5 ¢/kWh.

See also

 Atacama
 Atacama Desert
 List of solar thermal power stations
 Solar power in Chile
 Solar thermal energy

References

External links
  Municipality of Copiapó
  Chile Environmental Authority

Solar power stations in Chile
Solar thermal energy
Proposed solar power stations
Proposed renewable energy power stations in Chile